The New Zealand brill, Colistium guntheri, is an edible flatfish of the family Pleuronectidae.

Identification

The New Zealand brill is a righteyed flounder and so has both its eyes on the right-hand side of its body. Its upper surface is dark grey in colour, with its edges and fins almost black; the outer edge of each scale is black, which explains the longitudinal black lines that occur along the length of the body.

References

Pleuronectidae
Endemic marine fish of New Zealand
Taxa named by Frederick Hutton (scientist)
Fish described in 1873